Laura Neri (Greek: Λάουρα Νέρι) is a director of Greek and Italian origins. Born in Brussels, Belgium, she is a graduate of the USC School of Cinematic Arts in Los Angeles and has lived in Belgium, the US, the UK, Greece and briefly in Argentina.

References

External links

 Kill the Habit, official website

Belgian women film directors
Vrije Universiteit Brussel alumni
Belgian people of Italian descent
Belgian film directors
Living people
Mass media people from Brussels
USC School of Cinematic Arts alumni
Year of birth missing (living people)